Gelb may refer to:

 Gelb (album), by Neuroticfish
 Gelb (surname), people with the surname Gelb